Podocarpus drouynianus is a species of podocarp native to the relatively high rainfall southwestern corner of Western Australia, where it is known by the name emu berry, wild plum or native plum although it is not a true plum. The Noongar name for the plant is koolah.

Description
The plant is usually a shrub, not often forming a single trunk, instead growing multiple branches from around the base. It is dioecious and very slow-growing. The bark is thin and fibrous, green in colour turning red-brown on the outside.

Distribution
It grows on lower slopes and low-lying areas and around creeks in the South West and Great Southern regions of Western Australia where it grows in loamy, sandy or gravelly soils. It is associated as part of the understorey species present in lowland jarrah and karri and it spreads mostly by root suckering. The total area of occupancy by P. drouynianus has reduced as a result of clearing of forest for pasture and the replacement of native forest with exotics.

Cultivation
Ideally Podocarpus drouynianus should be grown in partial shade with plenty of water. Unusually for the genus, it tolerates quite dry conditions. It survives temperatures of up to 45 °C, and grows well in full sun or partial shade.

The plant grows as a rounded form in cultivation, slowly attaining two metres in height and 1.5 metres in width. Propagation from cuttings in the usual method of planting. The presentation of its red and fleshy fruit is unreliable, but the plant is favoured for its appealing foliage. The long and leafy stems are harvested for use in the florist industry.
The plum-like fruit is edible, although lacking any distinctive taste, and noted as an important food of the first peoples of Southwest Australia.

Classification
The species was initially described by the botanist Ferdinand von Mueller in 1864 in his work Fragmenta Phytographiae Australiae. There are two synonyms for this species: Nageia drouyniana and Podocarpus drouyniana. The species name honors the statesman Edouard Drouyn de Lhuys who was a member of the Institut de France.

References

  Database entry includes justification for why this species is listed as data deficient

drouynianus
Pinales of Australia
Endemic flora of Southwest Australia
Least concern flora of Australia
Plants described in 1864
Taxa named by Ferdinand von Mueller